Colin Trachsel (born 28 September 1997) is a Swiss footballer who plays for FC Köniz on loan from FC Thun II.

Career
In February 2019, Trachsel was loaned out from FC Thun to FC Köniz for the rest of the season. The deal was made permanent at the end of the season.

References

Swiss men's footballers
Swiss Super League players
1997 births
Living people
FC Thun players
FC Rapperswil-Jona players
FC Köniz players
Association football fullbacks